Bangladesh Railway Class 3000 is a class of meter-gauge diesel-electric locomotives which also could be use on broad-gauge by  of Bangladesh operated by Bangladesh Railway.

Builders details 
In the 1960s, some shunting locos entered the fleet of the then Eastern Bengal Railway as class/series-number 3000. The number of these locos were 11 probably. At present, none of them are active. None of them were preserved.

In 2020, 10 locos produced by Hyundai Rotem of South Korea under the license of Electro-Motive Diesel (EMD) of USA, entered the fleet of Bangladesh. They were also given the 3000 series. Though in the first phase, 10 locos came, 20 more in the second phase and 70 more in the third phase are planned to come in Bangladesh. These locos could be use on broad gauge track also by changing bogies. The newer locos are used for both passenger and freight trains.

Technical details 
The newer locos use the EMD 8-710G3A-T2 as prime mover. Their power is 2,200 hp and can achieve speed up to 110 km/h. The wheel arrangement is Bo1-1Bo (Each bogie having 2 powered axles & 1 unpowered inner axle) having total of 6 axles but only 4 traction motors. There are controversy regarding the model of Alternator used in the first 10 locomotives of the series, as Hyundai Rotem provided TA9-12CA9SE instead of TA12-CA9, which was to be provided as mentioned in the contract.

Classification and numbering 
The number-series/class of these locos is 3000. New locos are numbered from 3001 to 3010. First Shipment of the second phase 3011-3020 is also arrived in Bangladesh recently and under trial. Unlike 3001-3010 this 10 has Air Conditioned cab.  The class-name/specification of new locos is "MEI-20". Here, M = Meter-gauge, E = Diesel-electric, I = Hyundai Rotem and 20 = 22 × 100 = 2,000 hp (actually 2,200 hp). The class-name of old locos is unknown.

Liveries 

 Sky blue-yellow (new)

Gallery

Old Series

New Series

References

External links 

Locomotives of Bangladesh
Electro-Motive Diesel locomotives
Metre gauge diesel locomotives
Co-Co locomotives
Railway locomotives introduced in 2020